Hoplophanes is genus of moths of the family Heliozelidae. It was described by Edward Meyrick in 1897.

Species
Hoplophanes acrozona Meyrick, 1897 
Hoplophanes aglaodora (Meyrick, 1897) 
Hoplophanes argochalca (Meyrick, 1897) 
Hoplophanes chalcolitha Meyrick, 1897
Hoplophanes chalcopetala (Meyrick, 1897) 
Hoplophanes chalcophaedra Turner, 1923 
Hoplophanes chlorochrysa Meyrick, 1897 
Hoplophanes electritis Meyrick, 1897 
Hoplophanes haplochrysa Meyrick, 1897 
Hoplophanes hemiphragma Meyrick, 1897 
Hoplophanes heterospila Meyrick, 1897
Hoplophanes lithocolleta Turner, 1916
Hoplophanes monosema Meyrick, 1897 
Hoplophanes niphochalca Meyrick, 1897 
Hoplophanes panchalca Meyrick, 1897 
Hoplophanes peristera Meyrick, 1897 
Hoplophanes phaeochalca Meyrick, 1897 
Hoplophanes philomacha Meyrick, 1897 
Hoplophanes porphyropla Meyrick, 1897 
Hoplophanes semicuprea Meyrick, 1897 
Hoplophanes tritocosma Meyrick, 1897

Status unknown
Prophylactis memoranda Meyrick, 1897

References

Heliozelidae
Adeloidea genera